The 2021–22 season was the 115th season in the existence of SC Paderborn 07 and the club's second consecutive season in the second division of German football. In addition to the domestic league, SC Paderborn participated in this season's edition of the DFB-Pokal.

Players

First-team squad

Players out on loan

Transfers

Pre-season and friendlies

Competitions

Overall record

2. Bundesliga

League table

Results summary

Results by round

Matches
The league fixtures were announced on 25 June 2021.

DFB-Pokal

References

SC Paderborn 07 seasons
SC Paderborn 07